

Description 

N-Plants is an ambient album by Norwegian producer Geir Jenssen, a.k.a. Biosphere. For this album, Jenssen found inspiration in the Japanese post-war economic miracle. Each track title is named after a Japanese nuclear plant.

Geir Jenssen about N-Plants:

Track listing
"Sendai-1" – 8:01
"Shika-1" – 7:54
"Jōyō" – 5:31
"Ikata-1" – 5:05
"Monju-1" – 2:42
"Genkai-1" – 6:37
"Ōi-1" – 5:10
"Monju-2 – "3:58
"Fujiko" – 4:56

Credits
All tracks written and performed by Geir Jenssen. Photography by Yusuke Murakami. Mastered by Denis Blackham.

References

2011 albums
Biosphere (musician) albums
Touch Music albums